Daniel Kevin Elwell served in the Trump Administration as Deputy Administrator of the Federal Aviation Administration (FAA), and as the Acting Administrator of the FAA in addition to running the Next Generation Air Transportation System.

Appointed by President Donald Trump to become the FAA Deputy Administrator in June 2017, Elwell was promoted to Acting Administrator on January 7, 2018. He was succeeded by Stephen Dickson in August 2019.

Career

Raised in San Diego, Elwell graduated with a Bachelor of Science degree in International Affairs from the United States Air Force Academy in 1983. He moved on to Williams Air Force Base where he earned his pilot wings.

Elwell was a Command Pilot for the U.S. Air Force and U.S. Air Force Reserve. Elwell fought in the Operation Desert Storm in a combat capacity. Elwell eventually reached the rank of lieutenant colonel. He retired soon after.

For sixteen years, Elwell was a commercial pilot for American Airlines. Elwell also had a role of American Airlines's Managing Director for International and Government Affairs.  He also served as a legislative fellow for the late Senator Ted Stevens.  While working for Senator Stevens, Elwell was part of other aviation safety programs in Alaska, including the Capstone Program in the Yukon–Kuskokwim Delta, as well as the installation of real-time weather cameras at remote airfields and mountain passes.

Elwell was named Vice President of the Aerospace Industries Association in 2008 where he stayed until 2013. Elwell was a civil aerospace manufacturer representative in this capacity where he was an lobbyist for various companies.

Elwell joined Airlines for America (A4A) in 2013 where he was the Senior Vice President for Safety, Security, and Operations. Elwell left this role in 2015.

Elwell also served as the Senior Advisor on Aviation to Secretary of Transportation Elaine Chao.

Federal Aviation Administration
Elwell was named acting Administrator of the FAA upon the expiration of the previous Administrator, Michael Huerta's term. From 2006 to 2008, Elwell was the FAA Assistant Administrator for Policy, Planning, and Environment.  President Donald Trump appointed Elwell FAA Deputy Administrator in June 2017.

In an interview with Reuters in October 2020, Elwell announced he would resign from his position around the end of November.

References

External links

Year of birth missing (living people)
Living people
People from San Diego
United States Air Force Academy alumni
United States Air Force officers
Trump administration personnel
Administrators of the Federal Aviation Administration